In Chhattisgarh, Swami Atmanand dedicated his life to serving humanity. He has selflessly devoted his life to the tribal people and inspired young people by teaching them about compassion and serving others. To honor his legacy, the Swami Atmanand English Medium School Scheme was introduced. On November 1 2020, to mark Statehood Day, Chief Minister Bhupesh Baghel unveiled the Scheme.

A crucial factor in assessing a country's progress, along with access to healthcare and economic growth, is education. A nation can gain enormous benefits from investing in education in a variety of ways. And Chief Minister Bhupesh Baghel made such a significant investment in Swami Atmanand Excellent English Medium School that many future generations will profit from it.

Swami Atmanand English Medium School is a chain of English medium school established by Government of Chhattisgarh. The school is completely funded by Department of School Education, Government of Chhattisgarh. The education is free of cost till grade 8, afterward there is a nominal fee till grade 12.

This program aims to give talented students from the economically underprivileged segment of society an equal opportunity to succeed. As of November 2022, 279 schools have been opened including highly qualified teams of teachers and school heads that guarantee each student's overall growth and the chance to follow their passions.

Vision 

Chief Minister Bhupesh Baghel’s vision behind this scheme is to establish educational institutions in Chhattisgarh that have excellent facilities at par with private schools but are accessible and affordable for the parents of economically weaker sections of society as well. Old Preexisting government schools were also involved in the same order scheme to give this plan a tangible form. First and foremost, these preestablished schools' infrastructure was upgraded. Buildings were restored, classrooms received a fresh coat of paint, and outdated blackboards and green boards were swapped out for smart boards. New comfort batch workstations were installed in place of the obsolete bench table. Modern science apparatus was installed in newly constructed, functional labs.

In a school, a teacher is the most crucial necessity. English-medium instructors were therefore deputed from other schools to fulfill this requirement. Furthermore, contract teachers with subject-specific expertise were hired. There were put together teacher training programs. Smart boards were fitted for an audio-visually assisted interactive teaching and learning environment. The kids could comprehend the topic better as a result of this.

Swami Atmanand School Scheme has positively transformed the education structure and infrastructure in Chhattisgarh. The students here are being provided all the opportunities for growth and development, at par with the private schools of the metropolis, all free of cost.

Infrastructure 

Schools established under this program focus on a child's overall holistic development in addition to providing excellent education in English. The state's rural and forested districts, as well as the capital city Raipur, now have access to high-quality infrastructure and education because of this program.

To help kids reach their full potential, Swami Atmanand Schools are outfitted with a well-stocked library, a sports field, a practical lab, and other amenities. The Chief Minister has made the decision to open Atmanand schools that are taught in Hindi to strengthen the ties between the younger generation and the native language and culture. Local dialects have also been incorporated into the curriculum so that students can be proud of their culture, customs, and identity.

On July 3, 2020, the state's initial Swami Atmanand School was inaugurated. 52 schools opened their doors in various cities that same year. More than 20,000 applications were received in the first year. The number of applications climbed significantly as these schools gained prominence over time. More than 2.76 lakh applications were submitted in 2022–2023. The State Government has decided to open additional Atmanand schools in various regions of the state in light of the massive influx of applications and the rising popularity of the institutions. At present, 279 schools are operating in Chhattisgarh, 247 of which are in the English medium and 32 in Hindi.

Expansion 

People go great distances to visit and express their gratitude for taking this effort at the Bhent-Mulaqat programs of the Chief Minister Bhupesh Baghel . During the visits to Bhent-Mulaqat, there was also demand for the opening of additional Atmanand Schools.

Chief minister also said that the government would also establish English medium government colleges in various cities across the state to increase higher education in the region. In the beginning, ten institutions will be launched in ten cities.

Schools
As of 2021, there are 171 Swami Atmanand Schools in the entire state of Chhattisgarh. The aim was to provide quality education to the children from economically and socially weaker sections of the society.

LIST OF SCHOOLS

RAIPUR DISTRICT

Swami Atmanand English School R.D. Tiwari School, Amanaka, Raipur

Swami Atmanand English School B.P. Pujari School, Raipur

Swami Atmanand English Excellent School Mana Camp, Raipur

See also
 Jawahar Navodaya Vidyalaya
 Odisha Adarsha Vidyalaya
 Kendriya Vidyalaya

References

Schools in Chhattisgarh
Government of Chhattisgarh
Government Schemes in Chhattisgarh